Tyler Hill may refer to:

Tyler Hill, Kent, a village in Kent, England
Tyler Hill, Pennsylvania, an unincorporated community in Wayne County, Pennsylvania, United States
Tyler Hill (racing driver) (born 1994), American stock car racing driver
Tyler Edward Hill (1883–1932), leader in black politics in West Virginia